Nepal has been involved in many wars in its history. This list describes wars involving the historical Khasa-Malla Kingdom, Gorkha Kingdom, Kingdom of Nepal, as well as modern Nepal.

Khasa-Malla Kingdom (11th century-14th century)

Gorkha Kingdom (1559-1768)

Nepal (1768-2008)

See also
Military history of Nepal
Khasa-Malla Kingdom
Gorkha Kingdom
Gorkha Empire
Nepal

References

External links
 Nepal-Tibet war – Border Nepal Buddhi

Nepal
 
Wars